Moore House is a historic home located at Garrison in Putnam County, New York.  It was built about 1860 and is a modest two family, -story frame farm workers residence.

It was listed on the National Register of Historic Places in 1982.

References

Houses on the National Register of Historic Places in New York (state)
Houses completed in 1860
Houses in Putnam County, New York
National Register of Historic Places in Putnam County, New York